String Lakes is a pair of lakes in Cottonwood County, in the U.S. state of Minnesota.

The twin lakes were named from the fact their outlines appear like a string.

References

Lakes of Minnesota
Lakes of Cottonwood County, Minnesota